The East Coast Parkway (Abbreviation: ECP) is an expressway that runs along the southeastern coast of Singapore. As of July 2022, it is the third-longest expressway in Singapore. 

Unlike other expressways in Singapore whose abbreviation ends with 'E' for 'Expressway', the East Coast Parkway abbreviation ends with 'P' instead.

The East Coast Parkway used to be directly connected to the AYE. However, with the opening of the MCE on 29 December 2013, a section of expressway after the Benjamin Sheares Bridge was truncated and another section at the Marina South area realigned and converted into an arterial road.

The expressway, together with the MCE and the AYE could be interpreted as the southern east-west road in Singapore.

The expressway first heads southeast from Changi Airport before curving to follow the coastline after Xilin Avenue. It then follows East Coast Park past Upper East Coast, Siglap, Marine Parade and Mountbatten areas. After Exit 13 for Fort Road (signed 14A eastbound), the ECP curves further inland passing through the interchange with the MCE and KPE before the Benjamin Sheares Bridge which offers a beautiful view of the downtown. The highway (still on the bridge) curves south and into the Marina Bay Area, passing Marina Bay Sands.The ECP then ends near the 16-kilometre mark and turns into Shears Avenue (newly formed out of part of the truncated section of the former route). From here, drivers can choose to either turn left on Marina Boulevard towards Gardens by the Bay and the Marina Bay Cruise Centre, or choose to turn right  on Central Boulevard towards the Downtown Core and Chinatown.

History
Plans for the coastal highway to reduce congestion at Golden Mile started on 30 July 1969. Detailed plans were put in place to create interchanges at Nicoll Highway, Bras Basah Road and Stamford Road. On 3 September 1970, a $35 million plan was put in place to reclaim more land off of Bedok, with the final phase starting on 7 October 1970. On 18 December 1970, the government decided to reclaim more than 125 acres of land.

On 24 May 1973, the government proceeded to build a $300 million highway across the harbour to the breakwater line outside Clifford Pier to ease peak hour congestion at the Collyer Quay area. The plans involved the reclamation of land off Nicoll Highway and the breakwater at Clifford Pier. Reclamation was expected to begin in six to nine months. The 280m long bridge was to be built at a height of 30 ft above high water level to allow ample headroom for ferries to use the channel. The new highway would turn landwards to South Quay and then to the vacant piece of land past the Singapore Polytechnic, before turning towards Anson Road. To provide space for construction work, the government acquired the former Singapore Polytechnic site in 1975, with the polytechnic shifting to Dover. Plans were made on 16 January 1974 to extend Siglap Road to the expressway. On 28 February 1974, the government also acquired two portions of land, for the extension of Bedok South Avenue 1 from Upper East Coast Road to the ECP.

On 12 June 1974, tenders were invited for the construction of the super-highway which would link the east coast of Singapore to the city. The extension of East Coast Parkway was to run from Tanjong Rhu via the Kallang River to Marina Centre. Between the two crossings, the expressway would be connected to an interchange formed by a one-way pair of roads running on the reclaimed Marina Centre, connecting Ophir and Rochor Roads at Beach Road. It would take traffic to Orchard, Chinatown and Little India. It would also run through the reclaimed land in front of Shenton Way and Raffles Quay, before going to the Telok Ayer Basin at South Quay, where it would connect to the one-way pair of roads at Prince Edward Road and Maxwell Road. It was planned to run on the elevated structure across the former Singapore Polytechnic at Shenton Way. A separate project was planned to even extend the expressway to Keppel Road, before going towards the Jurong Expressway (to be known as Ayer Rajah Expressway).

On 24 April 1975, five international firms were invited to the tender of the construction of East Coast Parkway, leading to the construction of Benjamin Sheares Bridge. The expressway would also be linked to Ophir/Rochor Road, which would be built together with the flyover. The first phase would cover the portion from Tanjong Rhu Flyover to South Quay, while another section would lead from South Quay to Shenton Way.

Construction of the first phase of the East Coast Parkway from Fort Road to Marine Parade started in 1971 and was completed in December 1975. It was followed by an extension of Phase 2 which was completed in November 1975 to Bedok South Road and then Phase 3 was built together with Changi Airport in 1980. Construction of Phase 3 began in May 1976, with two interchanges at Xilin Avenue and the Pan Island Expressway. It was expected to be completed by 1978. They were built on reclaimed land by the former Public Works Department.

Construction of Phase 4, stretching from Fort Road to Keppel Road began in 1977 and was opened on 18 April 1981 to Ophir Road, and on 26 September 1981 towards Keppel Road. Shipyards had certain hours of restriction to navigation but the berths down should have no cause to worry . They could implement any expansion programme of their shipyards, which was awarded to Sato Kogyo, and was expected to be completed by the end of 1980. The government had decided to further reclaim the Marina South area, linking Tanjong Rhu and Telok Ayer Basin.

Traffic lights remained on the expressway until the completion of the last flyover at Fort Road in 1989. The opening of ECP relieved the traffic load of the city area in the 1980s. Traffic volume at Nicoll Highway decreased by 20 per cent, which would otherwise worsen with the new ERP gantries. Robinson Road and Cecil Street were better managed with lesser traffic jams with the declining load all the way to 1990s.

Flanked by East Coast Park on one side and high-rise housing on the other, the well-landscaped expressway was built and maintained with the conscious intention of giving visitors arriving via Singapore Changi Airport a good first impression of the country as they commute from the airport to the city centre in less than 15 minutes on a good day.

Traffic congestion during the morning peak hours, however, led to the introduction of an Electronic Road Pricing (ERP) gantry near the Tanjong Rhu Flyover in the direction towards the city, one of the first two gantries to be set up in the country, which came into operation on 1 April 1998 together with the other gantry at Ophir Road.

A decommissioned emergency highway strip was built in the long, straight section of the ECP close to Changi Airport. This section can be easily identified by removable potted plants instead of the standard large trees on the median strip. However, the highway strip has never been used for emergency landing purposes.

To facilitate the development of the new downtown, the ECP was truncated after the Benjamin Sheares Bridge, with the stretch at Marina South area realigned and converted to a major arterial road called Sheares Avenue. Instead, a new expressway, the Marina Coastal Expressway, was built to connect the ECP and the Kallang–Paya Lebar Expressway to the Ayer Rajah Expressway.

List of exits
{| class="wikitable"
|-
! scope="col" | Exit
! scope="col" | Destinations
! scope="col" | Remarks
|- style="background: #dff9f9"
| 1
| PIE (Tuas), TPE (SLE)
| Eastbound terminus; continues east as Airport Boulevard
|-
| 2A
| Tanah Merah Coast Road, Changi Village
| 
|- style="background: #ffdddd"
| 2B
| Xilin Avenue, Simei Avenue, Tampines
| Eastbound exit and westbound entrance only
|- style="background: #ffdddd"
| -
| East Coast Park Carpark H
| Westbound exit and entrance only
|- style="background: #ffdddd"
| -
| East Coast Park Carpark F3
| Westbound exit and entrance only
|- style="background: #ffdddd"
| 6
| Bayshore Road
| Eastbound exit and entrance only
|-
| 7A
| East Coast Park Service Road
| 
|-
| 7B
| Bedok South Avenue 1
| 
|- style="background: #ffdddd"
| 8A
| Siglap Road
| Eastbound exit and entrance only
|- style="background: #ffdddd"
| 8B
| Marine Vista
| Eastbound exit and entrance only
|-
| 10A
| East Coast Park Service Road
|
|-
| 10B
| Still Road South
|
|- style="background: #ffdddd"
| 11
| Tanjong Katong Road
| Eastbound exit and entrance; westbound entrance only
|-
| 13
| Fort Road
| Signed as Exit 14A eastbound
|- style="background: #ffdddd"
| 14B
| MCE (AYE)
| Westbound exit and eastbound entrance only
|-
| 14
| KPE (TPE)
| 
|- style="background: #dff9f9"
| 15
| Rochor Road
| Westbound terminus; continues west as Sheares Avenue

See also
 Marina Coastal Expressway
 Ayer Rajah Expressway
 Pan Island Expressway

References

External links

 Traffic cameras monitoring the ECP
 Infopedia article on East Coast Parkway

Expressways in Singapore
Bedok
Changi
Downtown Core (Singapore)
Kallang
Marina East
Marina South
Marine Parade
Tampines